The Religion is a horror novel written in 1982 by Nicholas Conde. It explores the ritual sacrifice of children to appease the pantheon of voodoo deities, through the currently used practice of Santería. The novel depicts the various deities and personas commonly seen in Santería, and it attempts to explain the connection and differences  between Santería(white magic)and Brujeria (black magic). In essence, the novel shows that there is a difference between Santeria and Brujeria, in which Brujeria is the evil force in the novel, where as Santeria is a force for good .

This religion is huge, complex and living in our midsts. Sacrifices must be made to save the world, or so they believe. Anthropologist Cal Jamison intends to study 'Santaria' but finds himself hopelessly ensnared. Trying to help a NY cop discover the killers of several children, he gets in over his head and finds his 7-year-old son Chris is in jeopardy. What is the price needed to ensure good? Can he rescue Chris in time? Who are his friends and who are his enemies? Chilling!

The novel served as the basis for the 1987 feature film ''The Believers.

References

American horror novels
1982 American novels
American novels adapted into films
Works about sacrifice
Works about Santería
New American Library books